The Ministry of Labour and Social Security (MLSS) is a Cabinet-level government ministry of Zambia. It is mandated to lead in the formulation and implementation of national employment, labour, and social security policy. The ministry is also responsible in monitoring national productivity, occupational safety and health, and relations between employees and their employers. The ministry is headed by Minister of Labour and Social Security Joyce Nonde-Simukoko.

Location
The headquarters of the MLSS are located in the New Government Complex in the Cathedral Hill neighborhood of the city of Lusaka, the capital of Zambia. The coordinates of the headquarters of the MCTI are 15°25'21.0"S, 28°17'25.0"E (Latitude:-15.422499; Longitude:28.290270).

Departments
MLSS is divided into the following administrative departments:

 Social Security Department
 Labour Department
 Planning Department
 Occupational Safety and Health Department
 Human Resources Department
 National Productivity and Development Unit

Social security project
Since 2007, the government has had a national security scheme for seniors aged 60 years and older. As of 2012, approximately 4,000 individuals were beneficiaries of monthly payments. The scheme is under expansion to cover more seniors.

List of ministers

Deputy ministers

References

External links
 Website of Zambian Ministry of Labour and Social Security

 
Labour and Social Security
Zambia
Zambia